Tychsen is a German surname.

Notable people with the surname include: 

 Oluf Gerhard Tychsen (1734–1815), German Orientalist and Hebrew scholar
 Thomas Christian Tychsen (1758–1834), German orientalist and Lutheran theologian
 Christian Tychsen, Danish governor
 Christian Tychsen, German recipient of the Knight's Cross of the Iron Cross
 Andrew C. Tychsen (1893–1986), United States Army brigadier general